Adrastus is a genus of beetles belonging to the family Elateridae.

The species of this genus are found in Europe.

Species:
 Adrastus rachifer
 Adrastus pallens

References

Elateridae
Elateridae genera